Pukarani (Aymara pukara fortress, -ni a suffix, "the one with a fortress", also spelled Pocarani, Pucarani) may refer to:

 Pucarani, a town in the La Paz Department, Bolivia
 Pukarani (Bolivia), a mountain in the Oruro Department, Bolivia
 Pukarani (Cochabamba), a mountain in the Cochabamba Department, Bolivia
 Pukarani (La Paz), a mountain in the La Paz Department, Bolivia
 Pukarani (Peru), a mountain with an archaeological site of that name in the Puno Region, Peru
 Pukarani (Potosí), a mountain in the Potosí Department, Bolivia

See also 
 Pukara (disambiguation)